Demeksa is a surname. Notable people with the surname include:

Bulcha Demeksa (born 1930), Ethiopian politician and businessman
Getachew Jigi Demeksa (born 1967), Ethiopian-Belgian scholar 
Kuma Demeksa (born 1958), Ethiopian politician

Surnames of African origin